Nolan Frese (born July 29, 1992) is an American football long snapper who is currently a free agent. He played college football at Houston.

Early life 
Nolan Frese was born in Fullerton but was raised in Roanoke, Texas and attended Keller High School before attending University of Houston.

Professional career
Frese signed with the Seattle Seahawks as an undrafted free agent on June 28, 2016 for a 3 year $1.62 million dollar contract. He beat out Clint Gresham and Drew Ferris for the Seattle Seahawks long snapping spot. On his first snap, Steven Hauschka made a 39-yard field goal against the Miami Dolphins. He went on to play all 16 games as the team's long snapper before being placed on injured reserve on January 3, 2017 after suffering an ankle injury in Week 17.

On August 2, 2017, Frese was waived by the Seahawks.

References

1992 births
Living people
Players of American football from Texas
American football long snappers
Houston Cougars football players
Seattle Seahawks players